Plopșoru is a commune in Gorj County, Oltenia, Romania. It is composed of eleven villages: Broșteni, Broștenii de Sus, Ceplea, Cursaru, Deleni, Izvoarele, Olari, Piscuri, Plopșoru, Sărdănești and Văleni.

References

Communes in Gorj County
Localities in Oltenia